Stefan Mutimirović was a 9th-century Serbian royal member of the ruling dynasty, the Vlastimirović.

He was the younger son of Mutimir of the ruling Serbian dynasty, the Vlastimirovići. His father had with his brothers Strojimir and Gojnik, defeated the Bulgar Army sent by Tsar Boris, led by his son Vladimir. They were captured with 12 boyars, but were soon freed in exchange for good relations between the peoples. Peace was agreed upon and Stefan and his older brother, Pribislav, escorted the prisoners towards the border beyond Rascia. There, Boris gave them rich gifts and received 2 slaves, 2 falcons, two dogs, and 80 furs from Mutimir.

References

Sources

 
 
 
Ferjančić, B. 1997, "Basile I et la restauration du pouvoir byzantin au IXème siècle", Zbornik Radova Vizantološkog Instituta, no. 36, pp. 9–30.
 

9th-century Serbian royalty
Vlastimirović dynasty
Slavic warriors